= Marcel Belliveau =

Canadian ice hockey player (1895–1964)

- Born: January 29, 1895; Moncton, New Brunswick, Canada
- Died: May 29, 1964 (aged 69)
- Height: 6 ft 0 in (183 cm)
- Weight: 180 lb (82 kg; 12 st 12 lb)
- Position: Left wing
- Shot: Left
- Played for: Montreal Canadiens
- Playing career: 1911–1920

Joseph Narcisse Marcel Belliveau (January 29, 1895 – May 29, 1964) was a Canadian professional ice hockey player. In 1913-14, he played with the Halifax Crescents of the Maritime Professional Hockey Association, scoring 21 goals in 24 games.

He played left wing for one game with the Montreal Canadiens of the National Hockey Association in 1914-15. After being released by the Canadiens, he returned east and played with the Sydney Millionaires of the Eastern Professional Hockey League.

In 1915, he joined the Canadian army in Europe and was severely wounded in the Battle of the Somme. After the war, he settled in Dorchester, New Brunswick. He coached the Dorchester college team to provincial championships in 1927 and 1928.
